James Ellis Ashton (12 April 1891 – 6 September 1961) was an Australian rules footballer who played with South Melbourne in the Victorian Football League (VFL).

Notes

External links 

1891 births
1961 deaths
Australian rules footballers from Victoria (Australia)
Sydney Swans players